Uberach is a former commune in the Bas-Rhin department in Grand Est in north-eastern France. On 1 January 2016, it was merged into the new commune Val-de-Moder.

Economy
 Microbrewery

Demographics

See also
 Communes of the Bas-Rhin department

References

External links

 Brewery in Uberach 
 Family Schalber living in Uberach since 1722 

Former communes of Bas-Rhin
Bas-Rhin communes articles needing translation from French Wikipedia
Populated places disestablished in 2016